Francisco Gomes da Rocha (1745–1808) was a Brazilian composer. He was the successor of Emerico Lobo de Mesquita in Vila Rica. Only five works, out of the 200 he would have produced, are preserved in manuscripts.

References 

Brazilian composers
1745 births
1808 deaths
People from Ouro Preto
Culture in Minas Gerais